Storm Chaser is a steel roller coaster located at Kentucky Kingdom in Louisville, Kentucky, United States. Designed by Alan Schilke and manufactured by Rocky Mountain Construction (RMC) at an estimated cost of $10 million, the ride opened to the public on April 30, 2016. It features three inversions, a 78-degree drop, and a maximum speed of  utilizing RMC's patented I-Box track technology.

Originally manufactured by Custom Coasters International, the ride first opened as a wooden dueling coaster named Twisted Sisters in 1998. After American heavy metal band Twisted Sister threatened to sue the park, the name was changed to Twisted Twins in 2002. It closed indefinitely in 2007, and its future became uncertain after Kentucky Kingdom ceased operations in 2010. RMC was hired to renovate the ride in time for the park's reopening in 2016. As a budgetary measure, some of the track and supports from Twisted Twins was reused. It was nominated for "Best New Ride For 2016", an Amusement Today Golden Ticket Award, placing second behind Dollywood's Lightning Rod.

History
In September 1997, operation rights for Kentucky Kingdom were sold by Themeparks LLC to Premier Parks for $64 million. Weeks after the deal was finalized in November 1997, the new operators announced plans to build a $5-million dueling roller coaster, called Double Trouble, in time to open during the 1998 season. The name was later changed to Twisted Sisters prior to the ride's opening. Following the purchase of Six Flags by Premier Parks in June 1998, the park was rebranded as Six Flags Kentucky Kingdom.

In 2002, the heavy metal band Twisted Sister threatened the park with legal action regarding the name of the roller coaster. To avoid a lawsuit, the park changed the ride's name to Twisted Twins. It operated under that name until the end of the 2007 season when the park closed the ride indefinitely, and the Gerstlauer trains were relocated to Six Flags St. Louis to be used as spare parts for The Boss, another Custom Coasters International ride with Gerstlauer trains.

Amid corporate bankruptcy on February 4, 2010, Six Flags announced that the park would cease operations immediately following the rejection of an amended lease by the Kentucky State Fair Board. Former operator of Kentucky Kingdom, Ed Hart, along with several other investors formed the Kentucky Kingdom Redevelopment Company with the aim of reopening the park quickly. However, plans were abandoned after sixteen months of negotiations. On February 23, 2012, the Kentucky Fair Board approved a lease agreement which would see the park operate as Bluegrass Boardwalk. The plans called for the removal of Twisted Twins and T2 as a result of safety concerns.

On June 27, 2013, Ed Hart's group negotiated an agreement to spend $36 million to reopen the park in May 2014. They also announced plans to transform Twisted Twins into "a much superior ride" and hoped to reopen it in 2016. Rocky Mountain Construction was eventually hired to refurbish the roller coaster with their patented IBox track design. In July 2015, Kentucky Kingdom announced plans to name the renovated ride Storm Chaser and open it during the 2016 season. The estimated cost for the new ride was $10 million.

Characteristics

Twisted Twins

In its original form, Twisted Twins was a dueling roller coaster, which featured two roller coaster tracks that departed from opposite ends of a single station. The two tracks  followed different paths, passing by each other four times. The ride was the only dueling roller coaster manufactured by Custom Coasters International, and was one of only two dual-tracked roller coasters manufactured by the company (Stampida at PortAventura Park is a racing roller coaster). The ride was designed by Dennis McNulty and Larry Bill, a duo responsible for many of the company's roller coasters. Construction of Twisted Twins was completed by Martin & Vleminckx.

A single train, manufactured by Gerstlauer, ran on each of the tracks. These two trains were named Stella and Lola, respectively. Each train seated 28 riders across seven cars configured in two rows of two.

Storm Chaser
According to park officials, Storm Chaser utilized some components of Twisted Twins' structure as a budgetary feature, but is otherwise a completely new experience. Storm Chaser utilized Rocky Mountain's IBox steel track system to create a ride experience that has the smoothness of a steel coaster with the faster pace of a wooden coaster. The new track also allows the train to perform inversions, something not normally seen on wooden roller coasters.

Comparison

Ride experience
Storm Chaser departs the station and makes a U-turn to the right to start up its lift hill. After cresting the top of the lift, the train banks left and enters a barrel-roll drop back down to ground level, followed by an airtime hill and an overbanked left-hand turn that leaves the train partially upside down for a short time. Storm Chaser then climbs another hill and banks right before turning to the left and heading back in the opposite direction and rounding an overbanked turn to the right.

The train crests another airtime hill before banking right and entering the final inversion, a corkscrew. Exiting the corkscrew and banking to the left, Storm Chaser passes over a series of camelback hills where the banking varies from side to side. The train then enters a 270-degree banked helix to the right, then rises to the left before entering the final brake run and returning to the station.

Reception

1998–2010: Wood 
The ride did not earn any placements in the Golden Ticket Awards' Top 50 wooden coasters during this time.

2016–present: Steel

References

External links
 Kentucky Kingdom's official website
 
 
 Storm Chaser at Rocky Mountain Construction
 

Amusement rides that closed in 2007
Kentucky Kingdom
Roller coasters in Kentucky
Roller coasters introduced in 1998
Hybrid roller coasters